The Episcopal Diocese of Venezuela is an Anglican diocese in Venezuela. It forms part of Province IX of the Episcopal Church. The current bishop is Orlando Guerrero Torres. The diocese became part of TEC in August 2003.

Bishops
 Guy Marshall (1972–1974; previously suffragan bishop (of Trinidad and Tobago) for Venezuela since 1967)
 Haydn Jones (1976-1986)
 Onell Soto (1987-1995)
 Orlando Guerrero Torres (1995-Present)

References

External links
 Episcopal Diocese of Venezuela

Venezuela
Protestantism in Venezuela
Province 9 of the Episcopal Church (United States)